De Pankoekstermolen is a smock mill in Witmarsum, Friesland, Netherlands which was built in 1900. It has been restored to working order and is designated as being in reserve. It is listed as a Rijksmonument.

History
De Pankoekstermolen was built in 1900 to drain the  Oosthemmerpolder. It replaced a mill built in 1817 that was struck by lightning and burned down in 1899. De Pankoekstermolen was built by millwright J H Westra of Franeker, Friesland. A diesel engine was installed in the mill in 1967. Until 1975, the mill was fitted with Patent sails. Construction of a new pumping station in 1976 made the mill redundant; the diesel engine was then removed. A restoration of the mill was carried out by millwright Westra of Franeker in 1975-76. On 21 June 1977, De Pankoekstermolen was sold to Stichting De Fryske Mole, the 15th mill bought by that organisation. In 2006, the mill was officially designated as being held in reserve. A new restoration was begun in 2014. It is listed as a Rijksmonument, №39438.

Description

De Pankoekstermolen is what the Dutch describe as a Grondzeiler. It is a two storey smock mill on a single storey base. There is no stage, the sails reaching almost to ground level. The mill is winded by tailpole and winch. The smock and cap are thatched. The sails are Common sails. The sails are carried on a cast iron windshaft, which was cast by Gietijzerij De Prins van Oranje, The Hague, South Holland. The windshaft carries the brake wheel which has 55 cogs. This drives the wallower (29 cogs) at  the top of the upright shaft. At the bottom of the upright shaft there are two crown wheels The upper crown wheel, which has 39 cogs, drives an Archimedes' screw via a crown wheel. The lower crown wheel, which has 35 cogs is carried on the axle of an Archimedes' screw, which is used to drain the polder. The screw is  diameter. It is inclined at 21°. Each revolution of the screw lifts  of water.

Public access
De Pankoekstermolen is open whenever it is working, or by appointment.

References

Windmills in Friesland
Windmills completed in 1900
Smock mills in the Netherlands
Windpumps in the Netherlands
Agricultural buildings in the Netherlands
Rijksmonuments in Friesland
Octagonal buildings in the Netherlands